Skua Gull Peak is a peak with a small lake enclosed near the summit, standing 2 nautical miles (3.7 km) northeast of Saunders Mountain and 0.5 nautical miles (0.9 km) south of Mount Stancliff in the Ford Ranges, Marie Byrd Land. Discovered in November 1934 by a sledging party of the Byrd Antarctic Expedition (1933–35) and so named because of the skua gull rookery found there.

Mountains of Marie Byrd Land